Colias fieldii , the dark clouded yellow, is a butterfly in the family Pieridae. It is found in southern Iran, India, southern China, Indochina, and Ussuri.

Biology
The larvae feed on Leguminosae species.

Subspecies
C. f. fieldii Yunnan, India 
C. f. chinensis Verity, 1909 S.Ussuri

Taxonomy
Accepted as a species by Josef Grieshuber & Gerardo Lamas

Description

Charles Thomas Bingham (1907) gives a detailed description:

Gallery

References

Butterflies described in 1855
fieldii
Butterflies of Asia
Butterflies of Indochina